Zamania is a constituency of the Uttar Pradesh Legislative Assembly covering the city of Zamania in the Ghazipur district of Uttar Pradesh, India.

History
Zamania is one of five assembly constituencies in the Ghazipur Lok Sabha constituency. Since 2008, this assembly constituency is numbered 379 amongst 403 constituencies. Before the separation of Uttrakhand from Uttar Pradesh, Zamania was numbered 232, amongst 425 constituencies.

Members of the Legislative Assembly

Election results

2022

Previous years

Raj Kumar Singh Gautam served as MLA for Zamania from 2007-2012, Om Praksh Singh served as MLA for Zamania from 2012-2017 and again from 2022. 

Bharatiya Janta Party candidate Sunita Singh won in 2017 Uttar Pradesh Legislative Elections by defeating Bahujan Samaj Party candidate Atul Rai by a margin of 9,264 votes. This was only the 2nd victory for BJP since the party's formation, the 1st came in 28 years earlier when Sharda Chauhan won with only 24,402 votes polled for BJP in 1991 & defeated Ravindra Yadav of Janata Dal by a margin of 2,357 votes to establish BJP's presence in the critical Assembly constituency. 1991 also was the 1st ever time when a female candidate  contested Zamania constituency and Chauhan was amongst the 10 female winners in a 425 member house. 

To highlight the importance of victory in critical Zamania constituency, Kalyan Singh had awarded state planning and transport ministries with independent charge to Smt Chauhan in Kalyan Singh ministry. Samajwadi Party continued the tradition by awarding cabinet berths to Kailash (won in 1996 by defeating Sharda Chauhan by a margin of 6,987 votes, 2002) & Omprakash Singh (won in 2012) in Mulayam Singh & Akhilesh Yadav governments.

References

External links
 

Assembly constituencies of Uttar Pradesh
Politics of Ghazipur district